Colchicum szovitsii subsp. brachyphyllum, synonym Colchicum brachyphyllum, is a subspecies of Colchicum szovitsii.

Nomenclature 
The subspecies name hrachyphyllum is formed from the Greek brakhus, short, and phullon leaf.

Characteristics
It is a perennial. Its corm is oval and 1–2 cm long. Its leaves are short at flowering time, eventually reaching 12 cm long over 2.5–3 cm wide, slightly undulate. Its flowers are numerous, white, pinkish white, or regular pink; tube rather thick. Its tepals are elliptico-lanceolate, lengthily tapered at base, more briefly at the apex, 2–3 cm long, 3–6 mm wide. Its stamens have brown anthers and filaments thickened at the base.

Seasonality
The plant flowers from January to June.

Range and habitat
The plant grows in Syria, Lebanon, and Turkey. It grows abundantly near the melting snow of the middle and upper mountains of the Beqaa Valley.

References

External links 

szovitsii subsp. brachyphyllum
Flora of Lebanon and Syria
Flora of Turkey
Taxa named by Pierre Edmond Boissier
Taxa named by Heinrich Carl Haussknecht
Plants described in 1882